Mélodie Vaugarny (born 26 July 1993) is a French judoka.

She is the bronze medallist of the 2019 Judo Grand Slam Paris in the -48 kg category.

References

External links
 

1998 births
Living people
French female judoka
21st-century French women